Homicide is the act of killing of another human.

Homicide may also refer to:

People
 Homicide (wrestler) (born 1977), American professional wrestler, born as Nelson Erazo
 DJ Homicide (born 1970), American DJ formerly of Sugar Ray

Arts, entertainment and media

Films and television
 Homicide (1949 film), an American film directed by Felix Jacoves 
 Homicide (1991 film), an American film by David Mamet
 Homicide (Australian TV series), a 1964–1977 Australian police procedural series

Simon's book and related media 
 Homicide: A Year on the Killing Streets (1991), a non-fiction crime book by David Simon
 Homicide: Life on the Street, a 1993–1999 American TV series inspired by David Simon's book
Homicide: The Movie (2000), a TV movie sequel to the series

Music
 "Homicide" (song), a song by Logic from his album Confessions of a Dangerous Mind
 "Homicide", a song by 999 from Separates
 "Homicide", a song by the German rapper Casper from his EP Grundstein
 "Homicide", a song by Wiz Khalifa from mixtape called Cabin Fever
 "Homicide", a song from the soundtrack of Danganronpa 2: Goodbye Despair